Portales Municipal Airport  is a city-owned, public-use airport located four nautical miles (7 km) southwest of the central business district of Portales, a city in Roosevelt County, New Mexico, United States. According to the FAA's National Plan of Integrated Airport Systems for 2009–2013, it is classified as a general aviation airport.

Although many U.S. airports use the same three-letter location identifier for the FAA and IATA, this airport is assigned PRZ by the FAA but has no designation from the IATA (which assigned PRZ to Prineville Airport in Prineville, Oregon).

Facilities and aircraft 
It has two asphalt paved runways: 1/19 is 5,700 by 60 feet (1,737 x 18 m) and 8/26 is 4,560 by 60 feet (1,390 x 18 m).

For the 12-month period ending April 4, 2008, the airport had 20,000 aircraft operations, an average of 54 per day: 85% general aviation and 15% military. At that time there were 21 aircraft based at this airport: 86% single-engine, 5% multi-engine and 9% helicopter.

References

External links 
 Aerial photo as of 19 September 1996 from USGS The National Map
 
 

Airports in New Mexico
Transportation in Roosevelt County, New Mexico
Buildings and structures in Roosevelt County, New Mexico